OTO Award TV Host – News

Currently held by  Adriana Kmotríková

First awarded  | Last awarded 2000 | Present  

OTO Award for TV Host – News has been awarded since the first edition of the accolades, established by Art Production Agency (APA) in Slovakia in 2000. Each year, the award has been presented to the most recognized television hosts in the news program of the past year with the ceremony permitted live by the national television network STV.

Winners and nominees

2000s

2010s

Superlatives

Notes
┼ Denotes also a winner in two or more of the main categories. Ю Denotes also a winner of the Absolute OTO category. ≠ Denotes a winner of the TV Journalism category. Ŧ Denotes a winner of the TV News and Journalism category.

References

External links
 OTO Awards (Official website)
 OTO Awards - Winners and nominees (From 2000 onwards)
 OTO Awards - Winners and nominees (From 2000 to 2009)

Host - News
Slovak culture
Slovak television awards
Awards established in 2000